Peter Ashley Abbott (born 1 October 1953 in Rotherham, South Yorkshire) is an English former professional footballer who played in the Football League, as a forward.

External links
Profile at ENFA
Profile at NASL

1953 births
Living people
Footballers from Rotherham
English footballers
Association football forwards
Manchester United F.C. players
Swansea City A.F.C. players
Connecticut Bicentennials players
Crewe Alexandra F.C. players
Southend United F.C. players
English Football League players
North American Soccer League (1968–1984) players
English expatriate footballers
Expatriate soccer players in the United States
English expatriate sportspeople in the United States